Inguinal ring can refer to:
 Superficial inguinal ring (annulus inguinalis superficialis)
 Deep inguinal ring (annulus inguinalis profundus)